Richard S. Knickle (born February 26, 1960) is a Canadian former professional ice hockey goaltender.

Biography
As a youth, Knickle played in the 1971, 1972 and 1973 Quebec International Pee-Wee Hockey Tournaments with a minor ice hockey team from Greenwood. He was drafted in the sixth round, 116th overall, by the Buffalo Sabres in the 1979 NHL Entry Draft. Knickle played for eleven different International Hockey League teams in his career. He later played fourteen games with the Los Angeles Kings in the National Hockey League. Knickle joined the Phoenix Coyotes as their Director of Amateur Scouting on July 28, 2011.

Awards
 WHL First All-Star Team – 1979

References

External links
 
 Rick Knickle @ hockeygoalies.org

1960 births
Albany Choppers players
Arizona Coyotes scouts
Brandon Travellers players
Brandon Wheat Kings players
Buffalo Sabres draft picks
Canadian ice hockey goaltenders
Columbus Blue Jackets scouts
Detroit Vipers players
Flint Generals (IHL) players
Flint Spirits players
Fort Wayne Komets players
Ice hockey people from New Brunswick
Ice hockey people from Nova Scotia
Las Vegas Thunder players
Living people
Los Angeles Kings players
Milwaukee Admirals (IHL) players
Muskegon Mohawks players
Nashville Predators scouts
People from Kings County, Nova Scotia
People from Miramichi, New Brunswick
Peoria Rivermen (IHL) players
Phoenix Roadrunners (IHL) players
Rochester Americans players
Saginaw Generals players
San Diego Gulls (IHL) players
Sherbrooke Canadiens players
Springfield Indians players